Lipstick is a cosmetic product.

Lipstick may also refer to:

People 
 Lois Long (1901–1974), known under the pseudonym Lipstick, American writer for The New Yorker during the 1920s

Arts, entertainment, and media

Films
 Lipstick (1960 film), a 1960 Italian crime-drama film
 Lipstick (1976 film), a 1976 film starring Margaux and Mariel Hemingway
 Why I Wore Lipstick to My Mastectomy or Lipstick, a 2006 American TV movie

Music

Groups and labels
 Lipstick (band), an all-girl Mongolian pop band

Albums
 Lipstick (Alejandra Guzmán album), 2004
 Lipstick (Orange Caramel album), 2012
 Lipstick, by Lipstick Generation, a band that included Billy Morris, 2014

Songs 
 "Lipstick" (Alejandra Guzmán song), 2004
 "Lipstick" (Alesha song), 2006
 "Lipstick" (Elise Estrada song), 2010
 "Lipstick" (Jedward song), 2011
 "Lipstick" (Rocket from the Crypt song), 1998
 "Lipstick", a 2005 single by Rockie Lynne
 "Lipstick"/"Ichiban Boshi", a 2007 single by Sachi Tainaka
 "Lipstick"/"Lamu no Love Song", a 2012 single by Orange Caramel
 "Lipstick", by Cassidy from Split Personality
 "Lipstick", a 2016 single by Runaway June
 "Lipstick", by Suzi Quatro from Rock Hard

Television
 Lipstick (TV series), a Hindi-language Indian series

See also